Henry Davies (1888 – 1927) was a Welsh socialist politician and trade unionist.

Born in Morfa, Davies worked as a coal miner, then as a checkweighman.  He joined the Independent Labour Party (ILP), and was a founder member of the Aberavon Constituency Labour Party.  He was elected to serve on the National Administrative Committee of the ILP, as the representative of its Welsh Division, from 1910 until 1912, and again from 1925.  He was also elected to Glamorgan County Council, and to Port Talbot Town Council, and was the Mayor of Port Talbot in 1924.  That year, he was also elected as chair of the ILP in South Wales.

In political matters, Davies worked closely with Tal Mainwaring, often giving public speeches on socialism together.  He was noted as the more impassioned speaker, and his political knowledge was broad; on returning home from work, he was known to dip his hands in cold water in order to wake himself up sufficiently that he could read.  He died in 1927, and a memorial hall was erected, as the headquarters of the Taibach Labour Group.

Davies' son, D. H. Davies, followed him into local politics, and served as Mayor of Port Talbot in 1949.

References

1888 births
1927 deaths
Councillors in Wales
Independent Labour Party councillors
Independent Labour Party National Administrative Committee members
Mayors of places in Wales
People from Port Talbot